The Rubens was an express train that linked Gare du Nord in Paris, France, with Bruxelles-Midi / Brussel-Zuid in Brussels, Belgium. The train was named after Flemish painter Peter Paul Rubens.

History

Trans Europ Express
The Rubens was introduced together with the TEE Memling in the TEE-network to cope with the raising number of passengers between Paris and Brussels. Both services were the first in the morning, the Rubens departed from Brussels at 6:42 in the morning, while the Memling departed from the Gare du Nord in Paris at 6:45. The return services were scheduled as the fifth of the six daily TEEs in both directions, departing around 6:45 p.m.

EuroCity
In 1987 the Rubens was, like the other Paris-Brussels TEE services, integrated into the new EuroCity network. On 23 May 1993 the EuroCity services between Paris and Brussels were classified as TEE again. After the opening of the LGV-Nord on 23 January 1995 the Rubens was withdrawn.

References

Works cited

EuroCity
International named passenger trains
Named passenger trains of France
Named passenger trains of Belgium
Railway services introduced in 1974
Trans Europ Express
Railway services discontinued in 1995
Peter Paul Rubens